The Foundation for Excellence in Education is a think tank on education reform based in Tallahassee, Florida.

History
The foundation was established by Jeb Bush, shortly after his tenure as Governor of Florida from 1999 to 2007. It has received donations from Bill Gates, Michael Bloomberg and Eli Broad, as well as Connections Education, a subsidiary of Pearson PLC, and Amplify, a subsidiary of NewsCorp.

The education reform policies suggested by the foundation have influenced Mitch Daniels, the former Republican Governor of Indiana, now President of Purdue University. Nicky Morgan, the British Secretary of State for Education, spoke at the 2014 Foundation for Excellence in Education Summit on November 20, 2014.

Former US Secretary of State Condoleezza Rice has served as its Chairman since January 2015.

References

External links
 

2007 establishments in the United States
Education policy organizations in the United States
Libertarian think tanks
Libertarian organizations based in the United States